Nyamati is taluk place located in Davangere District of the Karnataka state, India. It is approximately 108 km south of Davangere and 26 km north of Shivamogga.

Etymology 
It is believed that the name Nyamati was derived from earlier Kannada word Nelavarti and which has later transformed to Nyamati.

Population 

The village with total 6023 families residing. The Nyamati village has population of 25675 of which 11382 are males while 14293 are females as per Population 2018. The population of children with age 0-6 is 897 which makes up 9.66% of total population of village. Average Sex Ratio of Nyamati village is 986 which is higher than Karnataka state average of 973. Child Sex Ratio for the Nyamati as per census is 983, higher than Karnataka average of 948. Also, Nyamati village has higher literacy rate compared to Karnataka. In 2011, literacy rate of Nyamati village was 84.42% compared to 75.36% of Karnataka. In Nyamati Male literacy stands at 89.23% while female literacy rate was 79.54%.

History 
This rural town served as a taluk headquarters during the reign of Mysore Wodeyars. A commercial hub of Honnali taluk, This city was part of Shimoga district, later it became part of Davanagere district when new districts were formed by the then Chief Minister JH Patel. In response to the protest from local people, it is declared as a new taluk in 2017.

Nyamati is famous in vegetable production (green chili)  and also for areca sales from Malnad areas.

Geography
Nyamthi taluk is semi malnad (Are Malenadu) region located at

References 

Villages in Davanagere district